Michael A. Wobbema is a Republican serving as a member of the North Dakota Senate from the 24th district. Elected in November 2020, he assumed office on December 1, 2020.

Education 
Wobbema earned a Bachelor of Arts degree in business administration and accounting from the University of North Dakota and a Master of Business Administration from the University of Mary.

Career 
From 1994 to 1998, Wobbema was the CFO of Mail Center Inc., a mail services company. From 1996 to 2001, he served as the branch chief of the National Guard Bureau Counterdrug Directorate.  From 2001 to 2008, he served as a commander in the North Dakota Air National Guard. He served as assistant adjunct general of the North Dakota National Guard and director of the North Dakota Flood Recovery Office. Since retiring from the Air Force as a colonel, he has worked as a church administrator and founded a farm services company. Wobbema was elected to the North Dakota Senate in November 2020 and assumed office on December 1, 2020.

Legislative Agenda

2023 Legislative Session 
During the 2023 legislative session, Wobbema sponsered bills related to higher education,  censorship, transphobia, and sanctuary cities.  

Wobbema faced criticism when Reverend Dr. Leanne Simmons was praying over the Senate on February 8 when Senators Michael Wobbema (R-Valley City) and Janne Myrdal (R-Edinburg) turned their backs to her while she was saying “Creator of the universe and all people therein, You who formed humankind in Your image, placing them in this world in all their diversity — differing colors, genders, races, ethnicities and language. We praise You for the splendor of Your creation and the love that motivated Your hand on this Earth,”. Wobbema said they felt like they were being lectured because of the transgender bills that they would be voting on later this session. He added, “According to God’s word, people who are called to preach God’s word are held to a higher level of accountability.”

References 

Living people
University of North Dakota alumni
University of Mary alumni
Republican Party North Dakota state senators
People from Valley City, North Dakota
Year of birth missing (living people)